"Que Cosas Tiene el Amor" (English: "The Things That Love has") is a 2015 song by Dominican singer Anthony Santos and American singer Prince Royce. The song was released on March 24, 2015. It served as the first single for Santos' twenty-second studio album, Tocame (2015).

Charts

References

2015 singles
Prince Royce songs
Spanish-language songs
Male vocal duets